Immunoglobulin superfamily, member 2 (IGSF2) also known as CD101 (Cluster of Differentiation 101), is a human gene.

See also
 Cluster of differentiation

References

Further reading

External links
 

Clusters of differentiation